The National Print Museum in Beggar's Bush, Dublin, Ireland, collects, and exhibits a representative selection of printing equipment, and samples of print, and fosters associated skills of the printing craft in Ireland.  It was opened in 1996.

Mission and accreditation
The mission of the museum is to collect, document, preserve, exhibit, interpret and make accessible the material evidence of printing craft, and fosters associated skills of the craft in Ireland.  It aims to ensure that printers, historians, students and the general public can explore how printing developed and brought information, in all its forms, to the world.

The museum is fully accredited under The Heritage Council’s Museum Standards Programme for Ireland.

Collection and exhibits

The museum holds over 10,000 items including printing machinery, printing blocks, metal and wooden moveable type, ephemera, photographs, books, pamphlets and periodicals.

On exhibit is a representative display of the equipment and artefacts of the rich centuries-old printing heritage, including a replica Gutenberg press (on loan from The Tudors TV series).  There was also an original 1916 Proclamation (on loan until 2016) along with a machine (Wharfedale) similar to the one it was printed on.

Facilities
The museum has two floors, with a shop, a cafe at the rear, and a children's corner upstairs.

Activities
The National Print Museum's activities include guided tours, exhibitions, workshops, outreach, lectures and demonstration days.  Workshops focus on print-related crafts such as calligraphy, actual printmaking, and batik.

References

External links

Museums established in 1996
National museums of the Republic of Ireland
Industry museums
Printing press museums
Museums in Dublin (city)
Art museums and galleries in the Republic of Ireland
1996 establishments in Ireland